Lizette Thorne (24 November 1882 – 3 November 1970) was an English-born silent film actress. She starred in 45 films in her career, including The Thoroughbred and The Bruiser with actress Charlotte Burton. Thorne's film career began in 1912; she retired in 1921.

Partial filmography
 The Resolve (1915)
 In the Sunset Country (1915)
 The Thoroughbred (1916)
 True Nobility (1916)
 The Key (1916)
 The Dreamer (1916)
 The Bruiser (1916)
 The Fate of the Dolphin (1916)
 Faith (1916)
 A Dream or Two Ago (1916)
 Mary's Ankle (1920)
 Penny of Top Hill Trail (1921)
 A Broken Doll (1921)

External links

1882 births
1970 deaths
British expatriate actresses in the United States
English film actresses
English silent film actresses
People from Birmingham, West Midlands
20th-century English actresses